Robert Ronald Atwell (born 3 August 1954) is a British Anglican bishop, writer, and former Benedictine monk. Since April 2014, he has been the Bishop of Exeter. From 2008 to 2014, he was Bishop of Stockport, a suffragan bishop in the Diocese of Chester.

Early life and education
Atwell was born on 3 August 1954 in Ilford, Essex, United Kingdom. He was educated at Wanstead High School, a comprehensive school in Wanstead, London. He studied theology at St John's College, Durham, and graduated with a Bachelor of Arts (BA) degree in 1975. In 1976, he entered Westcott House, Cambridge to train for the priesthood. During his training, he spent a period of time in Rome studying at the Venerable English College, a Roman Catholic seminary, and at the Pontifical Gregorian University, a pontifical university. Following his ordination, he continued his studies and completed a Master of Letters (MLitt) degree from Durham University in 1979.

Ordained ministry
Atwell was ordained in the Church of England: first, made a deacon at Petertide 1978 (25 June), by Gerald Ellison, Bishop of London, at St Paul's Cathedral, and then ordained a priest the following St Peter's Day (29 June 1979) by Bill Westwood, Bishop of Edmonton, at St James Muswell Hill. His career began with a curacy at John Keble Church, Mill Hill in the Diocese of London from 1978 to 1981. From 1981 to 1987, he was chaplain of Trinity College, Cambridge and a lecturer in patristics.

In 1987, he entered the Order of St Benedict (OSB) and was granted Permission to officiate in the Diocese of Oxford. He spent ten years as a Benedictine monk at Burford Priory in Oxfordshire. Though he left the OSB in 1998, he maintains his link with the Benedictines as an oblate of Bec Abbey in Normandy, France.

In 1998, he left the OSB to return to parish ministry as Vicar of St Mary's Church, Primrose Hill, an Anglo Catholic parish in the Diocese of London. He held this role from 1998 until joining the episcopate in 2008.

Episcopal ministry
Atwell was consecrated a bishop at York Minster on 24 June 2008. He was welcomed into the Diocese of Chester as Bishop of Stockport on 27 June 2008 at Chester Cathedral.

On 21 January 2014, it was announced that Atwell would be translated to be the Bishop of Exeter. The confirmation of his election occurred on 30 April 2014. He was installed at Exeter Cathedral on 5 July 2014.

Views
Atwell supports the ordination of women to the priesthood and episcopate.

Styles
The Reverend Robert Atwell (1978–1987)
The Reverend Brother Robert Atwell, OSB (1987–1998)
The Reverend Robert Atwell (1998–2008)
The Right Reverend Robert Atwell (2008–present)

Selected works

References

1954 births
Alumni of St John's College, Durham
21st-century Church of England bishops
Living people
Bishops of Exeter
Bishops of Stockport
Alumni of Westcott House, Cambridge
People educated at Wanstead High School
English Benedictines
Fellows of Trinity College, Cambridge
Lords Spiritual